Constanza "Nina" Rignano (1871 – 1945) was an Italian philanthropist active from the 1830s until 1930s.

Biography
Rignano was born Constanza Sullam to wealthy Jewish parents in Milan, Italy and she received what was described as a modern education. She married Eugenio Rignano, a philosopher from Livorno who was also Jewish, in 1897.

Career

With her husband, Rignano contributed to the Societa Umanitaria and Universita Popolare. Alone she worked for women's education.

In 1901, Rignano wrote the bylaws for the Committee Against White Slavery.

She was discriminated against because she was Jewish. She was forced to resign from directorships and in May 1944 all of her assets were taken by law. She died in 1945.

References

See also
Salerno S. Il contributo femminile alla medicina del lavoro di fine ottocento [The women's contribution to occupational health at the end of the nineteenth century]. G Ital Med Lav Ergon. 2011 Jul-Sep;33(3 Suppl):460-4. Italian. PMID: 23393899.

1871 births
1945 deaths
People from Milan
Italian philanthropists
19th-century Italian Jews
20th-century Italian Jews
Women philanthropists